USS Gamage is a name used more than once by the U.S. Navy:

 , was a Civil War gunboat commissioned at Mound City, Illinois 23 March 1865
 , was launched on 8 March 1943 for use as floating storage for lubricants and drummed petroleum products

United States Navy ship names